Nordic combined at the 2009 European Youth Olympic Winter Festival was held from 16 to 20 February 2009. It was held in Szczyrk and Wisla, Poland.

Results

Medal table

Medalists

References 

2009 European Youth Olympic Winter Festival
2009 in Nordic combined
2015